HMS Aboukir was a 90-gun second-rate ship of the line of the Royal Navy launched in 1848.

Career
On 6 July 1861, Aboukir ran aground on Yeusta Skerry. Repairs cost £302. The navy refitted her with screw propulsion in 1858 and sold her in 1877. A monument on Southsea seafront commemorates an outbreak of Yellow Fever aboard her between 1873 and 1874.

Citations

Ships of the line of the Royal Navy
1848 ships
Albion-class ships of the line (1842)
Ships built in Plymouth, Devon
Floating batteries of the Royal Navy
Maritime incidents in July 1861